George Kerr may refer to:

Politics
 George Albert Kerr (1924–2007), Canadian politician
 George H. Kerr (1911–1992), United States diplomat
 George Kerr (Australian politician) (1853–1930), Australian politician, grazier, and blacksmith
 George Kerr (New Brunswick politician) (1805–?), Scottish lawyer and political figure in New Brunswick
 George Kerr, a New Zealand political candidate who stood in the electorate of Marlborough 11 times
 George Kerr (Ontario politician) (1849–1913), Ontario merchant and political figure
 George Kerr (UK politician) (died 1942), Scottish trade unionist and politician

Sports
 George Kerr (American football, born 1894) (1894–1980), American football player for the Cleveland Tigers and New York 
 George Kerr (American football, born 1919) (1919–1983), American football player for Boston College
 George Kerr (footballer) (born 1943), former manager of Lincoln City, Grimsby Town, and Rotherham United football clubs
 George Kerr (judoka) (born 1937), Scottish judo expert
 George Kerr (runner) (1937–2012), Jamaican athlete

Other
 George F. Kerr (1918–1996), English writer in Australia
 George Fraser Kerr (1895–1929), Canadian recipient of the Victoria Cross
 George Kerr (musician), record producer who produced The Whatnauts, The Manhattans, and The O'Jays

See also
 Kerr (surname)